In 3D computer graphics rendering, a hemicube is one way to represent a 180° view from a surface or point in space.

Shape
Although the name implies any half of a cube, a hemicube is usually a cube cut through a plane parallel to one of its faces. Therefore, it consists of one square face, one diamond shape face, two 2:1 aspect ratio rectangles, and two 1:2 aspect ratio rectangles totaling six sides.

Uses
The hemicube may be used in the Radiosity algorithm or other Light Transport algorithms in order to determine the amount of light arriving at a particular point on a surface.

In some cases, a hemicube may be used in environment mapping or reflection mapping.

3D computer graphics